The 1989 Rainha Cup was a women's tennis tournament played on outdoor hard courts at the Casa Grande Hotel in Guarujá, Brazil and was part of the Tier V category of the 1990 WTA Tour. It was the seventh edition of the tournament and was held from 11 December through 17 December 1989. Unseeded Federica Haumüller won the singles title and earned $13,5000 first-prize money.

Finals

Singles
 Federica Haumüller defeated  Patricia Tarabini 7–6(9–7), 6–4
 It was Haumüller's only singles title of her career.

Doubles
 Mercedes Paz /  Patricia Tarabini defeated  Cláudia Chabalgoity /  Luciana Corsato 6–2, 6–2

References

External links
 International Tennis Federation (ITF) tournament edition details
 Tournament draws

Rainha Cup
Brasil Open
1989 in Brazilian tennis
December 1989 sports events in South America